Suliszew  is a village in the administrative district of Gmina Nowy Kawęczyn, within Skierniewice County, Łódź Voivodeship, in central Poland.

The village has an approximate population of 150.

References

Suliszew